David Hutton Webster (March 24, 1875 − May 20, 1955) was an American sociologist, economist and anthropologist. He was Lecturer Emeritus of Sociology at Stanford University.

Biography
David Hutton Webster was born in Malone, New York on March 24, 1875. He went to California in 1893, receiving a A. B. from Stanford University in 1896, where he subsequently served as an assistant in economics from 1899 to 1900. From 1902 he was a teaching fellow in economics at Harvard University, where he received his Ph.D. in economics in 1904. For the next three years Webster was Assistant Professor of Economics at Williams College in Williamstown, Massachusetts. From there Webster went to the University of Nebraska, where he was Professor of Social Anthropology until 1933. He was later hired by Stanford University, of which his former classmate Ray Lyman Wilbur was president, serving there since 1940 as Lecturer Emeritus of Sociology. 

Webster was a member of the American Anthropological Association, the American Folklore Society, the American Sociological Society, the International Institute of Sociology, the Royal Anthropological Institute, Phi Beta Kappa, Pi Gamma Mu, the Harvard Club of New York, the Cosmos Club of Washington, D. C., and the Press and Union League Club of San Francisco.

Webster was killed by a train in Belmont, California on May 20, 1955. He was survived by seven children.

References

External links

 Hutton Webster at Find a Grave
 Hutton Webster at the Online Books Page
 Hutton Webster at the Biblio.com

1875 births
1955 deaths
American anthropologists
American economists
American sociologists
Harvard Graduate School of Arts and Sciences alumni
Harvard University faculty
People from Malone, New York
Railway accident deaths in the United States
Stanford University alumni
Stanford University faculty
University of Nebraska–Lincoln faculty
Williams College faculty